Benton County is a county located in the U.S. state of Tennessee. As of the 2020 census, the population was 15,864. Its county seat is Camden. The county was created in December 1835 and organized in 1836.

Benton County is located in northwest Tennessee, bordering the western branch of the Tennessee River and 30 miles south of the Kentucky border. Aside from Camden, other major communities include agrarian communities Big Sandy and Holladay. It is known well in the area for its duck hunting and fishing industries, and in the past, was recognized for sorghum production, although it is no longer produced there.

History
Benton County was formed in 1835 from part of Humphreys County. It was named in honor of David Benton (1779–1860), who was an early settler in the county and a member of the Third Regiment, Tennessee Militia in the Creek War.

Geography

Adjacent counties
Stewart County (northeast)
Houston County (northeast)
Humphreys County (east)
Perry County (southeast)
Decatur County (south)
Carroll County (west)
Henry County (northwest)

National protected area
Tennessee National Wildlife Refuge (part)

State protected areas

Big Sandy Wildlife Management Area (part)
Camden Wildlife Management Area
Nathan Bedford Forrest State Park
Harmon Creek Wildlife Management Area
Lick Creek Wildlife Management Area
Natchez Trace State Forest (part)
Natchez Trace State Park (part)
New Hope Wildlife Management Area

Demographics

2020 census

As of the 2020 United States census, there were 15,864 people, 6,762 households, and 3,832 families residing in the county.

2000 census
As of the census of 2000, there were 16,537 people, 6,863 households, and 4,886 families residing in the county.  The population density was 42 people per square mile (16/km2).  There were 8,595 housing units at an average density of 22 per square mile (8/2).  The racial makeup of the county was 96.44% White, 2.10% Black or African American, 0.33% Native American, 0.24% Asian, 0.20% from other races, and 0.69% from two or more races.  0.95% of the population were Hispanic or Latino of any race.

There were 6,863 households, out of which 27.30% had children under the age of 18 living with them, 58.10% were married couples living together, 9.50% had a female householder with no husband present, and 28.80% were non-families. 25.70% of all households were made up of individuals, and 12.30% had someone living alone who was 65 years of age or older.  The average household size was 2.37 and the average family size was 2.82.

In the county, the population was spread out, with 22.00% under the age of 18, 7.00% from 18 to 24, 26.20% from 25 to 44, 27.00% from 45 to 64, and 17.70% who were 65 years of age or older.  The median age was 42 years. For every 100 females there were 93.80 males.  For every 100 females age 18 and over, there were 91.40 males.

The median income for a household in the county was $28,679, and the median income for a family was $32,727. Males had a median income of $29,177 versus $19,038 for females. The per capita income for the county was $14,646.  About 11.90% of families and 15.60% of the population were below the poverty line, including 23.90% of those under age 18 and 11.70% of those age 65 or over.

Of the 16,459 people living in Benton County 0.03 percent are on some form of state advised probation.

Media

Radio stations
WRJB-FM 95.9 "Magic 95.9 the Valley"
WRQR-FM 105.5 (Henry Co)  "Today's Best Music with Ace & TJ in the Morning"
WTPR-AM 710 (Henry Co) "The Greatest Hits of All Time"
WTPR-FM 101.7 (Henry Co) "The Greatest Hits of All Time"

Newspapers
The Camden Chronicle
Tennessee Magnet Publications

Communities

City
Camden (county seat)

Town
Big Sandy

Census-designated place
Eva

Unincorporated communities

Holladay (partial)
Post Oak

Politics
Benton County, like most West Tennessee counties, was historically a Democratic county. The Democratic nominee for president carried the county in every election prior to 2008 with the exception of 1968, when the county was won by third-party candidate George Wallace, and 1972, when it was won by Republican Richard Nixon. Like most rural counties in the South, Benton County has swung dramatically toward the GOP in the 21st century, and since 2008, it has been a Republican stronghold. The last Democrat to carry this county was John Kerry in 2004.

See also
National Register of Historic Places listings in Benton County, Tennessee

References

External links

Benton County, TN Government Web Site
Benton County-Camden Chamber of Commerce
Benton County Schools

TNGenWeb

 
1836 establishments in Tennessee
Populated places established in 1836
West Tennessee